In Greek mythology, Aethilla or Aethylla (Ancient Greek: Αἴθιλλα or Αἴθυλλα) was Trojan princess as a daughter of King Laomedon and sister of Priam, Lampus, Hicetaon, Clytius, Hesione, Cilla, Astyoche, Proclia, Medesicaste and Clytodora.

Mythology 
After the fall of Troy Aethilla became the prisoner of Protesilaus, who took her, together with other captives, with him on his voyage home. He landed in Thrace in order to take in fresh water. While Protesilaus had gone inland, Aethilla persuaded her fellow prisoners to set fire to the ships. As a result of this being done, the Greeks were forced to remain on the spot and founded the town of Scione. According to other authors, the event took place in Italy; in commemoration of it, the nearby river received the name Nauaethus ("of the burning ships"), while Aethilla, Astyoche, and Medesicaste were surnamed the Nauprestidai ("they who set fire to ships").

In some accounts, it was a Trojan captive woman named Setaia who convinced her fellow prisoners to set fire to the ships. Setaia was crucified by the Greeks for doing so, but a town and a rock located on the spot where this had happened (not far from Sybaris) were named after her.

In Virgil's Aeneid, during Aeneas' and his fellow Trojans' stay in Sicily, some of the women set fire to their ships in order to make Aeneas settle where they were staying at the moment rather than sail further; even though the fire is quickly put down, several ships have been destroyed so some of Aeneas' people have to remain in Sicily, where they found Acesta (Segesta). This story is remarkably parallel to that of Aethilla and her fellow prisoners, but the characters are different: Virgil mentions Beroe, wife of a Doryclus, as the one who instigated the arson, and Pyrgo, the nurse of Priam, among those who supported her decision.

According to Strabo, the Sicilian river Neaethus (a variant for "Nauaethus") was called that because when "certain of the Achaeans who had strayed from the Trojan fleet" landed near it and went inland to explore the country, the Trojan women who were sailing with them, both being tired of the long voyage and having observed the fertility of the land, set fire to the ships in order to make the men stay there. Thus, Strabo's account contains elements of all the versions given above.

Notes

References 

 Apollodorus, The Library with an English Translation by Sir James George Frazer, F.B.A., F.R.S. in 2 Volumes, Cambridge, MA, Harvard University Press; London, William Heinemann Ltd. 1921. ISBN 0-674-99135-4. Online version at the Perseus Digital Library. Greek text available from the same website.
Bell, Robert E., Women of Classical Mythology: A Biographical Dictionary. ABC-Clio. 1991. .
Conon, Fifty Narrations, surviving as one-paragraph summaries in the Bibliotheca (Library) of Photius, Patriarch of Constantinople translated from the Greek by Brady Kiesling. Online version at the Topos Text Project.
 Diodorus Siculus, The Library of History translated by Charles Henry Oldfather. Twelve volumes. Loeb Classical Library. Cambridge, Massachusetts: Harvard University Press; London: William Heinemann, Ltd. 1989. Vol. 3. Books 4.59–8. Online version at Bill Thayer's Web Site
Diodorus Siculus, Bibliotheca Historica. Vol 1-2. Immanel Bekker. Ludwig Dindorf. Friedrich Vogel. in aedibus B. G. Teubneri. Leipzig. 1888-1890. Greek text available at the Perseus Digital Library.
Publius Vergilius Maro, Aeneid. Theodore C. Williams. trans. Boston. Houghton Mifflin Co. 1910. Online version at the Perseus Digital Library.
 Publius Vergilius Maro, Bucolics, Aeneid, and Georgics. J. B. Greenough. Boston. Ginn & Co. 1900. Latin text available at the Perseus Digital Library.
 Stephanus of Byzantium, Stephani Byzantii Ethnicorum quae supersunt, edited by August Meineike (1790-1870), published 1849. A few entries from this important ancient handbook of place names have been translated by Brady Kiesling. Online version at the Topos Text Project.
 Strabo, The Geography of Strabo. Edition by H.L. Jones. Cambridge, Mass.: Harvard University Press; London: William Heinemann, Ltd. 1924. Online version at the Perseus Digital Library.
 Strabo, Geographica edited by A. Meineke. Leipzig: Teubner. 1877. Greek text available at the Perseus Digital Library.

Princesses in Greek mythology
Women of the Trojan war